Kennedy William Gordy (born March 15, 1964), better known by his stage name Rockwell, is an American singer. He is most well known for his hit 1984 single "Somebody's Watching Me", which features Michael Jackson on chorus vocals. Gordy is the son of Motown founder Berry Gordy. Other relatives include half-siblings Redfoo, Rhonda Ross Kendrick and half-nephew Sky Blu.

Early life
Kennedy William Gordy is the son of Motown founder and CEO Berry Gordy and Margaret Norton. His father named him Kennedy William after John F. Kennedy and William "Smokey" Robinson.

Career
To avoid the appearance of nepotism, Gordy secured his record deal without his father's knowledge. Motown proposed the name of Rockwell and Gordy agreed to the change because he believed that he "rocked well."

In 1984, Rockwell released his most successful single "Somebody's Watching Me", with childhood friend Michael Jackson singing the chorus lyrics and Jermaine Jackson singing backup. "Somebody's Watching Me" became a RIAA gold-certified #2 song in the U.S. and peaked at #6 in the UK. It held #1 on Billboard's R&B chart for five weeks. Follow-up singles underperformed, and "Obscene Phone Caller" became Rockwell's only other Top 40 single. It reached #35 on the Billboard Hot 100. Rockwell released two more albums before ending his musical career with Motown.

Rockwell was not the first member of the Gordy family to hit Billboards Hot 100 as a recording artist. His uncle Robert Gordy reached the chart in 1958 with "Everyone Was There", recording under the name of Bob Kayli.

In late 2021, "Somebody's Watching Me" reentered the UK chart, peaking at #47.

Personal life
Rockwell is the son of Berry Gordy. Rockwell's paternal half-sister is actress Rhonda Ross Kendrick, the eldest child of Diana Ross. He is also closely related to the group LMFAO through his half-brother Redfoo (Stephen Kendal Gordy, son of Berry Gordy and Nancy Leiviska) and his half-nephew Sky Blu (Skyler Austen Gordy, son of his half-brother Berry Gordy IV and his wife Valerie Robeson). 

In July 2010, Rockwell married Nicole Moore. In 2013, he filed for divorce. The couple had no children together.

On November 29, 2018, Rockwell was arrested in Hollywood for allegedly beating a female associate with a chair at the Magic Castle Hotel after she approached him and demanded payment. Rockwell was released from jail on December 1, 2018 on a $30,000 bail. On January 7, 2019, the woman, who suffered multiple injuries from the attack and had undergone surgery to repair a broken arm, filed a lawsuit against Rockwell in Los Angeles for personal injury, claiming damages exceeding $25,000.

Discography

Studio albums

Singles

Filmography

References

External links

1964 births
Living people
20th-century African-American male singers
American male pop singers
African-American male  singer-songwriters
American dance musicians
Motown artists
Gordy family
Singers from Detroit
Singer-songwriters from Michigan
21st-century African-American male singers